The following is a list of living centenarians (living people who have attained the age of at least 100 years) known for reasons other than just their longevity. For more lists of centenarians, see lists of centenarians.

For living people known just for their longevity, see List of the oldest living people.

References

Living
centenarians